Peeter Urbla (born 2 June 1945 in Türi) is an Estonian film director, producer and screenwriter.

In 1969 he graduated from University of Tartu in art history speciality. In 1977 he finished his two-year courses for screenwriters and directors in Moscow.

1976–1989 he worked as a film director and screenwriter at Tallinnfilm and at Eesti Telefilm. In 1992 he founded independent film studio Exitfilm.

Selected filmography
  (1992)
  (1994)
 Agent Wild Duck (2002, producer)
 Lilya 4-ever (2002, associate producer)
 Shop of Dreams (2005)
  (2006, producer)
 Camino (2011)
  1943 (2012)
 Dora Gordine: Ars gratia artis (2014)
  (2015)
 Mausoleum (2016)
  (2016)
  (2018)
  (2019)
 Cerberus (2020)
  (2020, producer)

References

Living people
1945 births
Estonian film directors
Estonian screenwriters
Estonian film producers
University of Tartu alumni
Recipients of the Order of the White Star, 4th Class
People from Türi